Leptopelis viridis (the rusty forest treefrog or savannah tree frog) is a species of frog in the family Arthroleptidae. It is widely distributed in the West and Central African savanna zone between Senegal and the Gambia to the northeastern Democratic Republic of Congo (Garamba National Park).

Distribution
According to the International Union for Conservation of Nature (IUCN), Leptopelis viridis is recorded in the following countries (listed from west to east): Senegal, the Gambia, Guinea-Bissau, Guinea, Sierra Leone, Liberia, Ivory Coast, Burkina Faso, Ghana, Togo, Benin, Niger, Nigeria, Cameroon, and the Democratic Republic of the Congo. Further, it is expected to occur Mali, Chad, the Central African Republic, Sudan, and South Sudan.

Taxonomy
Leptopelis viridis was described in 1869 by Albert Günther, a German-born British zoologist, ichthyologist, and herpetologist. In 2007 it was shown that the holotype specimen of Leptopelis hyloides, described by George Albert Boulenger in 1906 as Hylambates hyloides, was a synonym of Leptopelis viridis. However, the species name Leptopelis hyloides (or Hylambates hyloides) had often been applied to a forest species (common name: Gbanga forest treefrog) distinct from L. viridis. This forest species was described as Leptopelis spiritusnoctis in 2007. All older records of Leptopelis hyloides, except the type, refer to Leptopelis spiritusnoctis.

Description
Males measure  (30–36 mm according to Rödel) and females  in snout–vent length. The dorsum is smooth and brown with a darker pattern, normally consisting of an occipital bar and an 'n'-shaped dorsal marking. Also a green specimen without a dark lateral stripe has been photographed. This suggests that a green phase may be present in this species. Indeed, the specific name viridis suggests that the type specimen had been green in life. Males have dark, almost uniform black throats. There is no webbing on hands and the webbing in feet is reduced.

Habitat and conservation
Leptopelis viridis lives in dry and humid savanna woodland, shrubland, and grassland; it tolerates  habitat alteration. Breeding takes place in temporary savanna ponds; the eggs, however, are not deposited in water but in burrows on the ground, near the water.

Leptopelis viridis  is a very common species that occurs in many protected areas. It is adaptable, and there are no significant threats to it.

References

viridis
Frogs of Africa
Amphibians of Cameroon
Amphibians of the Democratic Republic of the Congo
Amphibians of West Africa
Amphibians described in 1869
Taxa named by Albert Günther
Taxonomy articles created by Polbot